Paola Cardullo (born 18 March 1982 in Omegna) is a volleyball player from Italy, who was a member of the Women's National Team that won the gold medal at the 2007 European Championship in Belgium and Luxembourg. There she was named Best Libero of the tournament.

Career
Cardullo also competed at the 2004 Summer Olympics in Athens, Greece, where Italy ended up in fifth place and she was named Best Libero at the end of the Olympic tournament.

She won the bronze medal at the 2007–08 CEV Indesit Champions League with Asystel Novara and also was individually awarded Best Libero. In the 2012-12 champions league, Cardullo played with the French club RC Cannes, capturing the silver medal and the Best Libero award.

Cardullo played with her national team at the 2014 World Championship. There her team ended up in fourth place after losing 2-3 to Brazil the bronze medal match.

Clubs
  Pallavolo Omegna (1996–1999)
  AGIL Trecate (1999–2001)
  Asystel Novara (2001–2009)
  Villa Cortese (2009–2011)
  RC Cannes (2011–2012)
  Asystel MC Carnaghi (2012–2013)
  LJ Volley (2013–2014)
  Volley 2002 Forlì (2014–2014)
  River Piacenza (2014–2015)
  Volley Bergamo (2015–2018)
  Polisportiva Filottrano Pallavolo (2018–)

Awards

Individuals
 2002 World Championship "Fair Play Award"
 2002–03 CEV Challenge Cup "Best Libero"
 2003 World Grand Prix "Most Valuable Player"
 2004 FIVB World Grand Prix "Most Popular Player"
 2004 Olympic Games "Best Libero"
 2004–05 CEV Champions League "Best Libero"
 2005–06 Women's CEV Cup "Best Libero"
 2007 FIVB World Cup "Best Libero"
 2007 European Championship "Best Libero"
 2007–08 CEV Indesit Champions League Final Four "Best Libero"
 2009 European Championships "Best Libero"
 2011–12 CEV Champions League "Best Libero"

Clubs
 2002–03 CEV Challenge Cup -  Champions, with AGIL Novara
 2003 Italian Supercup -  Champions, with Asystel Novara
 2004 Italian Cup— Champions, with Asystel Novara
 2005 Italian Supercup -  Champions, with Asystel Novara
 2005–06 Women's CEV Cup -  Champions, with Asystel Novara
 2008–09 Women's CEV Cup -  Champions, with Asystel Novara
 2010 Italian Cup— Champions, with GSO Villa Cortese
 2011 Italian Cup— Champions, with GSO Villa Cortese
 2011–12 CEV Champions League— Runner-Up, with RC Cannes

References

External links
 FIVB Profile

1982 births
Italian women's volleyball players
Living people
Olympic volleyball players of Italy
People from Omegna
Volleyball players at the 2004 Summer Olympics
Volleyball players at the 2008 Summer Olympics
Sportspeople from the Province of Verbano-Cusio-Ossola
Serie A1 (women's volleyball) players